Tracheplexia is a genus of moths of the family Noctuidae described by Anthonie Johannes Theodorus Janse in 1937.

Species
 Tracheplexia amaranta (Felder & Rogenhofer, 1874)
 Tracheplexia conservuloides Berio, 1966
 Tracheplexia debilis (Butler, 1879)
 Tracheplexia galleyi Viette, 1981
 Tracheplexia leguerni Laporte, 1984
 Tracheplexia lucia (Felder & Rogenhofer, 1874)
 Tracheplexia richinii Berio, 1973
 Tracheplexia schista D. S. Fletcher, 1961

References

Hadeninae